"Can You Feel It, Baby?" is the second single by Australian band Sherbet, released in June 1971. It was released as the first single from Sherbet's debut studio album Time Change... A Natural Progression. The song charted at number 22 on Go-Set and it also peaked at number 16 on the Kent Music Report. The song was written by English songwriters Roger Cook and Roger Greenaway.

Track listing

Charts

Weekly charts

Personnel 
 Alan Sandow – drums, percussion, bongoes, chimes
 Daryl Braithwaite – lead vocals, tambourine, tabla
 Clive Shakespeare – guitar, vocals 
 Garth Porter – keyboards, clavinet, piano, lead vocals, backing vocals, Hammond organ, electric piano, synthesiser
 Bruce Worrall – bass guitar

References 

Sherbet (band) songs
1971 singles
1971 songs
Festival Records singles
Songs written by Roger Greenaway
Songs written by Roger Cook (songwriter)
Song recordings produced by Pat Aulton
Infinity Records singles